Dead River, is a 2012 Namibian short drama history film directed by Tim Huebschle and co-produced by Cecil Moller	and Marinda Stein. The film stars Christin Meinecke-Mareka and Jens Schneider in lead roles whereas Jade Coury, David Ndjavera and Hans-Christian Mahnke in supportive roles.

The film received critics positive acclaim and screened worldwide. The film received five awards and nominated for another eight awards.

Cast
 Christin Meinecke-Mareka as Lisa von Dornstedt
 Jens Schneider as Adolf von Dornstedt
 Jade Coury as Young Lisa
 Erven Katiti as David (Teen)
 Hans-Christian Mahnke as Ex Husband
 David Ndjavera as David
 Shaquille Shikwambi as Young David

References

External links 
 

Namibian short films
2012 films
2012 drama films
2012 short films
Films shot in Namibia
2010s English-language films
Namibian drama films